Alexander Roy Brown  (21 November 1914 – 8 August 2006) was an English footballer who made 18 appearances in the Football League playing at outside forward or inside right for Chesterfield, Darlington and Mansfield Town. He was on the books of Hartlepools United without representing them in the League, and played once for Gateshead in the abandoned 1939–40 Football League season. He also played non-league football for clubs including Blyth Spartans, Ashington and Shrewsbury Town.

References

1914 births
2006 deaths
People from Seghill
Footballers from Northumberland
English footballers
Association football forwards
Blyth Spartans A.F.C. players
Ashington A.F.C. players
Hartlepool United F.C. players
Chesterfield F.C. players
Darlington F.C. players
Shrewsbury Town F.C. players
Gateshead F.C. players
Mansfield Town F.C. players
English Football League players